Shady Grove, Arkansas may refer to any of the following communities:
   
Shady Grove, Baxter County, Arkansas
Shady Grove, Fulton County, Arkansas
Shady Grove, Johnson County, Arkansas
Shady Grove, Logan County, Arkansas
Shady Grove, Mississippi County, Arkansas
Shady Grove, Nevada County, Arkansas
Shady Grove, Poinsett County, Arkansas
Shady Grove, Pulaski County, Arkansas
Shady Grove, Washington County, Arkansas
Shady Grove, Woodruff County, Arkansas